Masafi is a village located on the edge of the Hajar Mountains in the United Arab Emirates. It sits at the inland entrance of the Wadi Ham, which runs down to Fujairah City. The border between the emirates of Fujairah and Ras Al Khaimah runs through the town, which houses a barracks used by the United Arab Emirates Armed Forces.

Overview

Until relatively recently, with the construction of the Sharjah to Kalba road and the 'truck road' between Dibba and the 311 highway at Ras al-Khaimah, the road through Masafi was the only route from the interior to the East Coast of the UAE. The road from the inland town of Dhaid splits at Masafi, leading to Dibba to the north and Fujairah City to the south.

A number of excavations point to Bronze Age habitation in Masafi, which has a recently restored (2012) stone and adobe fort, smaller but architecturally similar to the nearby Al Bithnah Fort, also restored as part of the same project. The fort encloses an exceptional example of a falaj, an underground waterway constructed to channel water from the mountains to the oasis towns of the interior.

At the turn of the 20th century, Masafi was a village of some 50 houses, with the villagers being split between the Sharqiyin and Mazari tribes, with some 30 cattle, 350 sheep and 5,000 date palms.

Masafi was the site of a rough airstrip used by the Trucial Oman Scouts.

Climate

Water bottling
Masafi is a branded producer of bottled water, juices and other consumer goods such as tissue paper. The company's 250,000 m² bottling plant is located in the northern part of the town, part of Ras Al Khaimah. Capable of producing 90,000 bottles an hour, the plant produced, until 2017, the only bottled water in the UAE labelled as mineral water, changing its branding to identify as 'Deep Earth Water'.

In 1980, the company was the sponsor of the first Masafi Car Rally, a popular annual event no longer held.

Masafi Friday Market

Located some 5 km West of Masafi (on the Dhaid Road), the Masafi Friday Market (Souk Al Juma'a) is actually open week-round and has become a popular tourist destination, consisting of a number of permanent and semi-permanent stalls selling toys, souvenirs, plants, carpets and rugs, pots and fruit and vegetables. The market grew around a number of farmers and other vendors using the presence of speed bumps on the road slowing traffic to sell vegetables and accessories from the backs of their trucks and expanded over time to form the present township.

Much of one side of the market (on the Masafi/Dhaid carriageway) was destroyed by fire on 30 May 2015.

Sports
 Masafi Club

References

Populated places in the Emirate of Fujairah
Villages in the United Arab Emirates
Populated places in the Emirate of Ras Al Khaimah
History of the United Arab Emirates
Archaeology of the United Arab Emirates